Samir Bourenane (born January 6, 1978 in Batna, Algeria) is an Algerian professional footballer. He currently plays as a midfielder for the Algerian Ligue 2 club MO Constantine.

References

External links

1978 births
Living people
Algerian footballers
MO Constantine players
Algerian Ligue 2 players
JSM Tiaret players
MC El Eulma players
People from Batna, Algeria
Association football midfielders
21st-century Algerian people